Michael Ferriter is a retired United States Army Lieutenant General. He served as commanding general of the United States Army Installation Management Command/U.S. Army Assistant Chief of Staff for Installation Management from 2011 until 2014. During his career he has participated in Operation Restore Hope in Somalia, and served three tours of duty in Iraq.  On June 19, 2018, he was named president and CEO of the National Veterans Memorial and Museum in Columbus, Ohio.

Military career

Ferriter graduated from The Citadel with a Bachelor of Science degree in Business Administration in May 1979, and was commissioned in the infantry as a Second Lieutenant. After the Infantry Officer Basic Course, his first troop assignment was with the 2d Battalion, 16th Infantry, at Fort Riley, Kansas, where he commanded a weapons platoon and a support platoon, and then became S4 (Logistics) on the battalion staff.

After attending the Infantry Officer Advanced Course at Fort Benning, Georgia, from April to October 1983, he became Assistant S3 (Operations) on the staff of the 6th Battalion, 327th Infantry at Fort Wainwright, Alaska, and then commander of its C Company. He was posted to Fort Lewis, Washington, in October 1986, where he was S5 (Civil Military Operations) and then S1 (Personnel) on the staff of the 2nd Battalion, 75th Ranger Regiment, and then commander of its B Company. This was followed in July 1989 by service as S3 (Operations), on the staff of the 4th Battalion, 23d Infantry (Mechanized), which was part of the 9th Infantry Division, but still based at Fort Lewis.

Ferriter attended the United States Army Command and General Staff College at Fort Leavenworth, Kansas, between July 1989 and July 1990. He then became Regimental S5 (Civil Military Operations) of the 75th Ranger Regiment at Fort Benning. After a time as S3 (Operations), on the staff of the 3d Battalion, he became Regimental S3 (Operations). In this capacity, he participated in Operation Restore Hope in Somalia. He commanded the 2d Battalion, 504th Parachute Infantry of the 82d Airborne Division at Fort Bragg, North Carolina, from November 1994 to June 1996 and the 3d Battalion, 75th Ranger Regiment at Fort Benning from July 1996 to June 1998.

In August 1998 he became a Senior Service College Fellow at Tufts University's Fletcher School of Law and Diplomacy in Medford, Massachusetts. He assumed command of the 11th Infantry at Fort Benning in July 1991. His first Joint Staff assignment was as deputy director for operations and plans, J3, and then executive assistant to the commander, United States Joint Forces Command, in Norfolk, Virginia. This was followed by duty as assistant division commander (operations) of the 82d Airborne Division at Fort Bragg, North Carolina in June 2004. He then served in Operation Iraqi Freedom as deputy commanding general (operations) of the Multi-National Corps – Iraq, after which he returned to being J-3 of the Joint Forces Command in Norfolk.

Ferriter was deputy commanding general (operations) of the XVIII Airborne Corps at Fort Bragg from August 2007 until January 2008, when he returned to Iraq for a second tour as deputy commanding general (operations) of the Multi-National Corps – Iraq, again returning to duty as deputy commanding general (operations) of the XVIII Airborne Corps at Fort Bragg in April 2009. In June 2009 he became commanding general of the United States Army Infantry Center and commandant of the United States Army Infantry School at Fort Benning. This was followed by duty as commanding general of the United States Army Maneuver Center of Excellence there from October 2009 to November 2010.

From January to October 2011 Ferriter was deputy commander for advising and training of the United States Forces – Iraq as part of Operation New Dawn. From November 2011 until May 2014, he served as assistant chief of staff for installation management and commanding general, United States Army Installation Management Command in Washington, D.C.

Personal life
 "The Ferriters are a great Army Family," noted the Chief of Staff of the United States Army, General Raymond T. Odierno "and IMCOM is fortunate to have them.  As IMCOM Commander, Ferriter is quoted as saying "Always remember that the strength of our nation is our Army. The strength of our Army is our soldiers. The strength of our soldiers is our Families. And that’s what makes us Army Strong."

Awards
His awards and badges include the Distinguished Service Medal, Defense Superior Service Medal (with Oak Leaf Cluster), Legion of Merit (with 3 Oak Leaf Clusters), Bronze Star Medal (with Oak Leaf Cluster), Defense Meritorious Service Medal, Meritorious Service Medal (with 5 Oak Leaf Clusters), Army Commendation Medal (with Oak Leaf Cluster), Army Achievement Medal (with 2 Oak Leaf Clusters), Expert Infantryman Badge, Master Parachutist Badge, Air Assault Badge,  and Ranger Tab.

Dates of rank

Notes

External links

 
 

Living people
United States Army generals
Recipients of the Distinguished Service Medal (US Army)
Recipients of the Legion of Merit
The Citadel, The Military College of South Carolina alumni
Year of birth missing (living people)